Weaning the Calves is an oil-on-canvas painting by French artist Rosa Bonheur, painted in 1879. It is held at the Metropolitan Museum of Art, in New York.

Description
The painting was probably inspired by the artist's trip to the Pyrenees, where she did several studies in 1850, or to the United Kingdom. It depicts a pasture where a cow looks upon five calves, who are separated from her by an artificial barrier made of wood, stone and debris. The painting is a metaphor for the process of emancipation of the calves through their weaning, which despite being initially difficult becomes strengthening. The scene of the foreground opens to other pasturelands, where a small structure is depicted to the left, and five adult cows are seen to the right. The mountains which serve as the background for the painting are majestic and in accordance with the romantic mentality.

References

1879 paintings
Paintings by Rosa Bonheur
Cattle in art